Serbia and Montenegro originally planned to participate in the Eurovision Song Contest 2006. The union of public broadcasters of Serbia and Montenegro, Udruženje javnih radija i televizija (UJRT) organised the national final Evropesma-Europjesma 2006 in order to select the Serbian and Montenegrin entry for the 2006 contest in Athens, Greece. The Serbian national broadcaster, Radio Television of Serbia (RTS), and the Montenegrin broadcaster Radio i televizija Crne Gore (RTCG) each submitted twelve entries from their respective selections Beovizija 2006 and Montevizija 2006 with twenty-four entries in total competing in the national final on 11 March 2006. The song "Moja ljubavi" written by Milan Perić and Dalibor Nedović performed by the band No Name, which had previously represented Serbia and Montenegro in the Eurovision Song Contest in 2005 where they placed seventh in the final with the song "Zauvijek moja", was initially selected as the winner following the combination of votes from an eight-member jury panel and a public televote. However the results were not recognized by UJRT due to controversy surrounding tactical voting of the Montenegrin jury, and the broadcaster ended up not submitting any entry.

As one of ten highest placed finishers in the 2005 contest Serbia and Montenegro directly qualified to compete in the final of the Eurovision Song Contest which took place on 20 May 2006. However, Serbia and Montenegro was removed from the contest on 20 March due to UJRT not being able to submit an entry by the submission deadline with the empty slot in the final being replaced by Croatia.

Background 

Prior to the 2006 Contest, Serbia and Montenegro had participated in the Eurovision Song Contest two times since its first entry in 2004 when they achieved their best placing in the contest with the song "Lane moje" performed by Željko Joksimović, placing second in the final. The Serbian and Montenegrin entry in 2005, "Zauvijek moja" performed by No Name, placed seventh in the final. Up to this point, Serbia and Montenegro had featured in every final of the Eurovision Song Contest they participated in.

The union of public broadcasters of Serbia and Montenegro, Udruženje javnih radija i televizija (UJRT), organises the selection process for the nation's entry with Serbia and Montenegro's respective broadcasters, Radio Television of Serbia (RTS) and Radio i televizija Crne Gore (RTCG), broadcasting the event within their respective republics. UJRT confirmed their intentions to participate at the 2006 Eurovision Song Contest on 23 November 2005. In 2004 and 2005, the Evropesma-Europjesma national final had been used in order to select their entry, a procedure that continued for the selection of the 2006 entry as announced along with their participation confirmation.

Before Eurovision

Montevizija 2006 
Montevizija 2006 was the second edition of Montevizija. It served as the Montenegrin semifinal for choosing the Serbo-Montenegrin entry for Eurovision Song Contest 2006 in Athens, Greece. The final was held on 24 February 2006 at the RTCG Studios in Podgorica, presented by Zoja-Spahić Kustudić, Andrija Milošević, Danilo Čelebić, Irena Ivanović and Milena Ristić. Twenty songs competed and nine juries – 8 jury members and a public televote determined the twelve songs to progress to the final of Evropesma-Europjesma.

Beovizija 2006 
Beovizija 2006 was the 4th edition of Beovizija. The final was held on 10 March 2006 in Sava Centar in Belgrade. 23 songs competed in the Beovizija 2006 contest, one song, due to be performed by Nevena Paripović, was not featured, though no reason was given for this. Nine juries – 8 jury members and a public televote determined the twelve songs to progress to the final of Evropesma-Europjesma.

Evropesma-Europjesma 2006 
Evropesma-Europjesma 2006 was national final organised by UJRT in order to select the Serbian and Monetengrin entry for the Eurovision Song Contest 2006. The competition took place at the Sava Centar in Belgrade on 11 March 2006, hosted by Jelena Jovičić and Boda Ninković. The show was broadcast in Serbia on RTS1 and RTS Sat as well as streamed online via the broadcaster's website rts.co.yu, and in Montenegro on TVCG 1 and TVCG Sat.

Competing entries 
The two broadcasters in Serbia and Montenegro, Serbian broadcaster RTS and Montenegrin broadcaster RTCG, each conducted separate selections in order to select the twenty-four entries to proceed to the national final: RTS organised Beovizija 2006 on 10 March 2006 where twenty-three songs competed, while RTCG organised Montevizija 2006 on 24 February 2006 with twenty entries competing. From each selection, the top twelve entries qualified for the national final and among the competing artists was No Name which represented Serbia and Montenegro in the Eurovision Song Contest 2005.

Final 
The final took place on 11 March 2006 where twenty-four songs competed. The winner, "Moja ljubavi" performed by No Name, was decided by a combination of votes from a jury panel and the Serbian and Montenegrin public via televoting. The Serbian jury consisted of Milan Đurđević (musician), Zoran Dašić (RTS music editor and composer), Jovan Maljoković (composer and jazz musician) and Tanja Banjanin (singer), while the Montenegrin jury consisted of Predrag Kalezić (producer), Milica Belević (editor and music critic), Bojan Bajramović (President of the Association of Pop Artists and Performers of Montenegro) and Predrag Janković (professor at the University of Montenegro Music Academy). Eurovision contestants Hari Mata Hari, Severina, Brian Kennedy, Elena Risteska and Anžej Dežan, which would represent Bosnia and Herzegovina, Croatia, Ireland, Macedonia, and Slovenia in 2006, respectively, were featured as guest performers during the show.

Controversy 
Evropesma-Europjesma 2006 saw the same voting pattern from the jurors from both republics. Despite the public vote winners, Serbian Beovizija 2006 winner Flamingosi featuring Louis receiving over 7,000 votes more than the runner-up, Beovizija 2006 runner-up Ana Nikolić, both of them did not receive any points from the Montenegrin jurors whereas No Name, which placed third in the public vote, were awarded eight points by the Serbian jurors (which awarded the Montenegrin acts about 1/4 of their votes) making it enough for them to score another win as all four Montenegrin jurors (which awarded the Serbian acts about 1/10 of their votes) awarded them maximum points. Realizing that the favourites were not going to win, the audience started leaving the event with the remaining audience booing No Name off the stage and throwing objects (such as bottles) at the stage during the reprise. The audience then wooed Flamingosi and Louis on stage as they performed their song with the other Serbian acts present on stage.

Withdrawal 
Shortly after the competition, RTS held a press conference where it was announced that the two Serbian jurors that awarded No Name points, Milan Đurđević and Zoran Dašić, had withdrawn their votes in dispute of the tactical voting of the Montenegrin jury. The Executive Board of UJRT later issued a statement stating that they did not accept the victory of No Name as the voting violated the merits of the competition, albeit not being found irregular. Following failed negotiations of a new national final featuring the top five entries of Beovizija 2006 and Montevizija 2006 with the winner selected entirely by public televoting, both RTS and RTCG requested from the European Broadcasting Union (EBU) to intervene in accepting or annulling the competition results, however the EBU responded on 18 March by suggesting that the broadcasters find a solution on their own.

On 20 March, the deadline for entry submissions to the 2006 Eurovision Song Contest, the EBU announced that Serbia and Montenegro would be removed from the contest due to UJRT failing to submit an entry in time. However, RTS, the Serbian member of UJRT, would still broadcast the semi-final and final, and only viewers in Serbia would be able to vote.

At Eurovision
According to Eurovision rules, all nations with the exceptions of the host country, the "Big Four" (France, Germany, Spain and the United Kingdom) and the ten highest placed finishers in the 2005 contest are required to qualify from the semi-final in order to compete for the final; the top ten countries from the semi-final progress to the final. As Serbia and Montenegro finished seventh in the 2005 contest, the nation automatically qualified to compete in the final on 20 May 2006. However, following Serbia and Montenegro's withdrawal from the contest on 20 March an empty slot for automatic qualification was left in the final, which was given to Croatia as they finished eleventh in 2005.

The semi-final and the final were broadcast in Serbia on RTS1 and RTS Sat with commentary by Duška Vučinić-Lučić, and in Montenegro on TVCG 2 and TVCG Sat with commentary by Dražen Bauković and Tamara Ivanković. The Serbian and Montenegrin spokesperson, who announced the Serbian and Montenegrin votes during the final, was Jovana Janković. During the presentation of the points, Janković pointed Serbia to return to the contest the following year with the best possible song and thus win the contest; Serbia debuted at the 2007 Eurovision Song Contest for the first time as an independent nation, winning the contest with their entry "Molitva" performed by Marija Šerifović. Janković also hosted the Eurovision Song Contest 2008 in Belgrade alongside Željko Joksimović.

Voting 
Below is a breakdown of points awarded by Serbia and Montenegro in the semi-final and grand final of the contest. The nation awarded its 12 points to Bosnia and Herzegovina in the semi-final and the final of the contest.

Points awarded by Serbia and Montenegro

After Eurovision
On 21 May 2006, one day after the final of the Eurovision Song Contest 2006, an independence referendum was held in Montenegro, where the majority of its population voted for independence. Montenegro formally declared its independence on 3 June 2006, and two days later, the State Union of Serbia and Montenegro officially ceased to exist. Both countries participated in the 2007 Eurovision Song Contest separately as independent nations in Helsinki, Finland, with Serbia winning the contest and Montenegro failing to qualify to the final until 2014.

References

2006
Countries in the Eurovision Song Contest 2006
Eurovision
Eurovision